Daphne Willis is a singer and songwriter residing in Nashville, Tennessee.


Early life 
Willis was born in San Antonio, Texas on March 10, 1987. Willis grew up in a musical family. Her mother studied classical vocal performance at the University of Texas where her father was an audio engineering major and worked at CBR Records/Sony Music for more than 30 years. The Willis family moved to Chicago, Illinois in 1989 where Willis attended grade school and then studied English and Secondary Education at DePaul University.

Career 
Willis began singing at a young age but did not start playing guitar until her high school years. As a student at DePaul, Willis began performing at open mics, which progressed to ongoing local Chicago performances and, eventually, the decision to leave school and go on the road. A touring band was formed and Willis toured extensively performing over 200 shows a year across the Midwest. In September 2007, Willis' first EP Matter of Time was released independently.

Vanguard Records head Kevin Welk heard one of Willis' songs on an American Airlines flight and sent A&R rep Gary Paczosa to Chicago to meet her. After signing a deal with Vanguard Records in 2008, Willis released her second EP, Exhibit A. In the latter half of 2009, Willis headed for the Tennessee hills to begin writing and recording her first full length album. What to Say was released in 2010. The album was co-produced by Tim Lauer and Grammy Award winning Gary Paczosa. "My Shoes", a track from this record was featured on ABC's Switched at Birth.

Album number two, Because I Can, was produced by Tim Lauer and released in 2011 on Vanguard Records. Shortly after the release, Willis was interviewed on NPR's Weekend Edition Saturday with Host Scott Simon. Because I Can reached the #2 spot on iTunes Top 40 Singer/Songwriter Chart. The track titled "Sad" was featured on the CW Network One Tree Hill. Trevor Hall makes a guest appearance on the track titled "Circumstances".

Willis parted ways with Vanguard in early 2012 and produced an independent CD, Live to Try, in 2014, which was largely co-written with John Oates, who also plays guitar and sings on the album.

In 2015, Willis signed a publishing deal with Sony ATV. In the fall of 2015, she released an EP, Get It, featuring the hit single Done With Being Done, co-written with Meghan Trainor.

Discography 
 Matter of Time, 2007
 Exhibit A, 2008
 What to Say, 2010
 Because I Can, 2011
 Spread Music, 2013
 Live to Try, 2014
 Get It, 2015
 "Somebody's Someone", 2017
 Freaks Like Me, 2017

References

External links 

 Daphne Willis Official Website

1987 births
Living people
American women pop singers
Musicians from Nashville, Tennessee
Singers from Texas
21st-century American women singers
21st-century American singers